Nikka Zaildar 2 is a 2017 Punjabi romantic comedy film directed by Simerjit Singh, written by Jagdeep Sidhu and starring Ammy Virk, Sonam Bajwa, and Wamiqa Gabbi as the main lead roles and the film was released worldwide on 22 September 2017. It is second installment of Nikka Zaildar (film series) and is not a sequel to 2016 film Nikka Zaildar.

Plot
Nikka is in love with Saawan but circumstances force him to marry Roop, his childhood friend. The story then follows towards his attempts to marry Saawan. Circumstance make the family believe that Roop can't conceive and his second marriage is arranged with Saawan. In the end he realizes that he is in love with Roop now.

Cast 
Ammy Virk as Nikka
Sonam Bajwa as Roop Kaur
Wamiqa Gabbi as Saawan Kaur
Nirmal Rishi as Nikka's Bebe (Deso Kaur)
Sardar Sohi as Gurdit Singh- Nikka's grandfather
Rana Ranbir as Boota- Nikka's chacha
Rakhi Hundal as Mindo- Nikka's Chachi 
Gurmeet Saajan as Saudagar Chacha
Gurpreet Bhangu as Roop's grandmother
Sharry Mann as Wadha Subedaar-Varinder (special appearance)
Prakash Gaadhu as Naajar 
Baninder Bunny as Chamkaur
Gurinder Makna as Saawan's Fuffad
Ansh Tejpal as Doctor 
Prince Kanwaljit Singh as Teacher 
Malkit Rauni as Sarpanch 
Parminder Gill as Roop's mother

Reception

Box office

Reviews
It was reviewed by Santa Banta with the statement — "Though it was a good overall experience there are short-comings too. The climax could have been better. To control the length of the movie the climax was not treated in a proper way. But this can be ignored as rest of the performances are too good."

Track listing

Sequel

A Sequel Nikka Zaildar 3 was released on 20 September 2019.

References

2017 films
Punjabi-language Indian films
2010s Punjabi-language films
Indian sequel films
Films directed by Simerjit Singh